Isaac Dutton Barnard (July 18, 1791February 28, 1834) was an American militia leader, lawyer, and politician who served as a United States Senator for Pennsylvania from 1827 to 1831. He served as a Major in the U.S. Army during the War of 1812 and as a Pennsylvania State Senator for the 4th district from 1820 until 1826.

Early life and education
Barnard was born is Aston Township, Pennsylvania to James and Susanna Dutton Barnard.  The family name is derived from Roche-Bernard in Normandy, France where the family originated.  Barnard's great-grandfather, Richard emigrated to Chester County, Pennsylvania prior to 1686.

Barnard worked as a scholar at several public schools.  He lived in Philadelphia until 1811 and then moved to Chester, Pennsylvania.

Military career
At age 20, Barnard received a commission as Captain of the Fourteenth Regiment, United States Infantry.  He opened a recruitment station in West Chester, Pennsylvania.  He fought in the War of 1812 and saw action at Baltimore, Sackett's Creek, the Canadien Frontier, Fort George, La Cole's Mill, the battle of Crysler's Farm, the Battle of Plattsburgh and Lyon's Creek.  At Fort George, he was promoted from captain to major in the same unit for meritorious service.

He served as a Major General of the Pennsylvania State Militia.

Political career
After the war ended he resumed his legal studies, and was admitted to the bar on May 1, 1816.  He began practicing law in West Chester.  Barnard was the deputy attorney general for Chester County from 1817 to 1821, and an Assistant Burgess in the government of the borough of West Chester in 1821, 1824, and 1825.  Barnard was also a major-general of militia, and declined the judgeship of Chester County.

Barnard served as a member of the Pennsylvania State Senate for the 4th district from 1821 to 1826.  He was instrumental in securing funds for a memorial to the Battle of Paoli.

The year he left the State Senate, he was the Secretary of the Commonwealth of Pennsylvania.  He was elected to the United States Senate as a Jacksonian, and began his first term on March 4, 1827.  During the 21st and 22nd United States Congresses, he was the chairman of the Committee on Militia.  In 1829, Barnard was closely defeated in his attempt to gain the nomination for Governor of Pennsylvania.  James Buchanan, at the time a U.S. Representative, described Barnard in a letter as "a high minded honest man" who will never "become the tool of any man".

He undertook part of a second Senate term, but resigned from the Senate on December 6, 1831, due to ill health.   He was replaced by a future Vice President of the United States, George M. Dallas.  Just before he resigned, the New York papers were reportedly demanding that Barnard be given a place in the United States Cabinet.

Personal life
In 1820, Barnard married Harriet Darlington, the daughter of Isaac Darlington.  She died during childbirth in 1823 and he never remarried.

Legacy
Barnard died on February 28, 1834, in West Chester.  He was originally interred at the Friends Burying Ground on North High Street but after twenty years he was re-interred in Oaklands Cemetery.

William Everhart, a wealthy merchant and friend of Barnard's, named a street in West Chester after Barnard sometime after the summer of 1830.

In 1854, a monument in Oaklands Cemetery was erected in his memory.

Footnotes

Sources

External links
Account of Barnard's work regarding a monument to the Battle of Paoli

|-

1791 births
1834 deaths
People from Delaware County, Pennsylvania
Democratic-Republican Party United States senators from Pennsylvania
Pennsylvania Democratic-Republicans
Pennsylvania Jacksonians
Secretaries of the Commonwealth of Pennsylvania
Pennsylvania state senators
Pennsylvania lawyers
19th-century American politicians
19th-century American lawyers
United States Army officers
People from Pennsylvania in the War of 1812
Burials at Oaklands Cemetery